BBC World Service is an international broadcaster.

World Service may also refer to:

 World Service (Delirious? album), a 2003 album by Delirious?

See also
 World Service Authority